The Secondary School Luís de Camões is a secondary school located in the civil parish of Arroios, in the municipality and Portuguese capital of Lisbon, classified as a Monumento de Interesse Público (Monument of Public Interest) in 2012.

Founded in 1902 and named after Portuguese poet Luís de Camões, it is one of the largest and most prestigious secondary schools in Lisbon, known for the many important Portuguese public figures who have attended it, including novelist António Lobo Antunes, current UN Secretary-General António Guterres and former President of the European Commission José Manuel Barroso.

History

At the beginning of the 20th century, and following the reform of the lyceum educational system by the Ministry and Secretary-of-State for Business, in 1905, Eduardo José Coelho the public school equipment initiated a period of development. This involved the rationalization of teaching which extended to the reorganization of spaces, as exemplified by architects Miguel Ventura Terra and José Marques da Silva, who worked on many of the lyceums in Lisbon and Porto. In Lisbon, Ventura Terra was responsible for work done on the Pedro Nunes (1906), Camões (1907) and Maria Amália (1913) lyceums, which became a reference to school architecture in the era and modernized the building culture of the city.

In 1907, Miguel Ventura Terra (1866-1919) was commissioned by the Ministry of the Kingdom and Direção-geral da Instrução Secundária Superior Especial to install a lyceum on State lands. Construction on the site began in January 1908, under the supervision of António Ribeiro. The final project was inaugurated on 16 October 1909.

The lyceum of Camões was constructed to substitute the old National Lyceum of Lisbon, created in 1902, and inadequate for the teaching needs and number of students. At the time of its inauguration there was a general consensus that the building had beautiful conditions and a model for hygiene and pedagogic teaching, as reported by the newspapers. Critics noted that the school was isolated on the square (the Largo do Matadouro Municipal), which was a natural zone on the edge of urban expansion and little accessible. The lyceum, owing to its purpose-built nature (from scratch and specific to teaching) was an architectural educational reference, both formally and esthetically, respecting the functional necessities of the site. The great number of students that this urban lyceums received, and that hygiene theories at the time, meant that there was an obligation to include physical education classes, resulting in a modular system of pavilions used for complimentary classes, with patios and exterior recreational spaces. The principal wings, used for traditional teaching rooms were linked to new sporting pavilions, gymnasium, change rooms and projected swimming pool (which were unique for the country at the time). The lyceum was a public utility, functional and rationalist. It was projected to integrate into the urban fabric, albeit isolated initially. Ventura Terra delineated a construction model that was more simple then the habitual designs, responding to the a request by the first rector of the Central Lyceum, Rui Teles Palhinha:
construction of a building that purpose built...that obeyed the principals of the utmost economy, with the eye to a precise school of airyness and light...and dispensing with pumice and rich woods.
Ventura Terra therefore included rectangular articulated blocks, using new materials for the time (iron and tile) and a composition that did not include closed corridors in favour of halls open to the patio and exterior galleries, and multiple recreational spaces.

Two decades later, in 1927, two pavilions were constructed for physical education and chemistry classes, in response to new reforms in the education system, along with the necessity to alienate the laboratories from the principal installations, to avoid accidents.

In the 1930s, the building was remodelled, in order to expand students, as well as install a new canteen and annexes.

The DGEMN began work on the site in 1954, with periodic repairs and conservation projects, by the Direcção dos Serviços de Construção e Conservação (1954), then the Serviços de Construção e Conservação (1957 and 1961). In 1959, two pavilions/halls were constructed by the Serviços de Construção e Conservação, in conjunction with the Junta de Construções para o Ensino Técnico e Secundário.

In 1970, a bust of Camões commissioned and executed by Fernando Fernandes, which was presented in 1972.

On 3 August 2006, the Vice-President of IPPAR initiated a process to classify the building, that terminated on 6 December 2011 with its classification as a Monumento de Interesse Público by the DRCLVTejo.

Architecture

The site is situated in an urban landscape, occupying half of the block delimited by the Praça José Fontana, Rua Almirante Barroso, Rua da Escola de Medicina Veterinária and Rua Dona Estefânia. The Praça José Fontana (a triangular "square") and organized around the Jardim de Henrique Lopes de Mendonça fronts the main facade of the school, separated urban arterial and grated fence with access by pavement stone. To the south, in the neighbouring block, is the Escola Superior de Medicina Veterinária (Supeior School of Veterinary Medicine) and to the north, the small walls of the old lyceum, oriented to the Rua Almirante Barroso and the primitive Escola Industrial António Arroio (Industrial School António Arroio).

The symmetrical rectangular plan, in the form of a trident is composed of a principal facade, and two lateral wings, as well as central body parallel to this, that creates two vast, rectangular open spaces used as recreational areas. The halls are distributed, essentially, in the lateral wings and the central block used for gymnasium and refectory, while the front facade provides the administrative spaces for the institution. In the administrative wing is the bust of Camões.

Notable people

Literature 

 Mário de Sá-Carneiro
 Tomás Cabreira Júnior
 Aquilino Ribeiro
 José Rodrigues Miguéis
 Rómulo de Carvalho
 Mário Dionísio
 Jorge de Sena
 José Cardoso Pires
 Luiz Pacheco
 Vergílio Ferreira
 Fernando Namora
 Urbano Tavares Rodrigues
 Almeida Faria
 António Lobo Antunes
 Mário de Carvalho
 Manuel da Fonseca
 João Aguiar
 Baltazar Lopes da Silva
 José Gomes Ferreira
 Eduardo Prado Coelho
 Nuno Júdice
 Júlio Isidro

Politics 

 

 Álvaro Cunhal
 Durão Barroso
 António Guterres
 Francisco Cunha Leal
 Garcia Pereira
 Marcelo Caetano
 Rui d'Espiney
 João Semedo

Medicine 

 Nuno Lobo Antunes
 João Lobo Antunes
 Cesina Bermudes
 Mateus Martins Prata
 José Manuel Domingos Pereira Miguel

Sports 

 Mário Moniz Pereira

Music

 Jorge Palma
 Frederico de Freitas
 Burinda Aguiar

Social sciences 

 Luís Lindley Cintra
 Delfim Santos
 João Bénard da Costa
 Arlindo Manuel Caldeira
 Luís Ribeiro Soares

Film and theatre 

 Luís Miguel Cintra
 Jorge Silva Melo
 Nicolau Breyner
 Francisco Ribeiro (Ribeirinho)
 Eugénio Salvador
 Francisco Nicholson
 António Montez
 Rui Mendes

References

Notes

Sources
 
 
 
 
 
 
 
 
 
 
 
 

Educational institutions established in 1909
1909 establishments in Portugal
Schools in Lisbon
Secondary schools in Portugal